The Second Satō Cabinet is the 62nd Cabinet of Japan headed by Eisaku Satō from February 17, 1967 to January 14, 1970.

Cabinet

First Cabinet reshuffle 
The first Cabinet reshuffle took place on November 25, 1967.

Second Cabinet reshuffle 
The second Cabinet reshuffle took place on November 30, 1968.

References 

Cabinet of Japan
1967 establishments in Japan
Cabinets established in 1967
Cabinets disestablished in 1970